Héctor Martín Sturla Berhouet (Montevideo, 13 July 1953 - 22 April 1991) was a Uruguayan lawyer and politician.

A man of the National Party, he supported Luis Alberto Lacalle and Jorge Machiñena, and he was elected to Parliament in November 1984. In the following election, with Lacalle elected President of the Republic, Sturla was appointed President of the Chamber of Deputies of Uruguay in 1990.

He died in 1991. Nowadays there is a square with his name in Montevideo and a political group of the National Party.

His youngest brother Daniel, a Salesian cleric, is the current archbishop of Montevideo.

References

1953 births
1991 deaths
People from Montevideo
Uruguayan people of Italian descent
University of the Republic (Uruguay) alumni
National Party (Uruguay) politicians
Members of the Chamber of Representatives of Uruguay
Presidents of the Chamber of Representatives of Uruguay